The 14-inch M1920 railway gun was the last model railway gun to be deployed by the United States Army. It was an upgrade of the US Navy 14"/50 caliber railway gun. Only four were deployed; two in the Harbor Defenses of Los Angeles and two in the Panama Canal Zone, where they could be shifted between the harbor defenses of Cristobal (Atlantic) or Balboa (Pacific).

History 

After the close of World War I, the US Army wanted to incorporate the lessons learned from other railway gun mounts and fulfill coastal artillery requirements for hitting a moving target. An effort to design a more universal mount for the Navy's Mk. IV 14"/50 caliber gun was undertaken.

The primary difference from the earlier Navy versions lies in the M1920 carriage, which could be raised and lowered. Prepositioned fixed mounts were installed at the forts, and the gun's rail trucks could be taken out from under the frame. After the removal of the rail trucks, the gun was lowered and bolted onto a pivot point for rapid 360 degree movement, necessary for tracking ships in coast defense. The M1920 carriage made the gun much more flexible. It allowed for the standard practice of using a curved piece of rail to traverse the gun, and it enabled the gun to be used in a fixed position.

Two guns were deployed to Fort MacArthur in the Harbor Defenses of Los Angeles, with firing platforms at Fort MacArthur and Long Beach. The remaining two guns were deployed to Fort Grant and Fort Randolph in the Panama Canal Zone. The two guns deployed to the Panama Canal Zone could be moved to either coast on the Panama Canal Railway. After World War Two ended, the threat of a massive war was over and the United States scrapped these weapons as well.

Models 

The Mk.IV gun was manufactured in two models:
 M1920MI centerline of breechblock mechanism canted 16 degrees counterclockwise to fit recoil band
 M1920MII breech mechanism is set straight in relation to axis of tube.

Sighting and fire control equipment 

The following sighting equipment was used with the gun:
 bore sight
 firing tables- 14-m-1, 14-e-3, 14-g-2.
 M1 fire adjustment board
 M1 generating unit (mounted on the forward railway truck)
 M1 gunners quadrant
 M1 plotting and relocating board
 M1 prediction scale
 M1A1 height finder
 M1A1 range correction board
 M7 spotting board
 M8 helium filling kit
 M1910 azimuth instrument
 M1912A1 clinometer
 M1917MI panoramic telescope
 M1918 aiming rule
 M1922 panoramic telescope

Support cars 
 M1 powder car
 M1 projectile car
 M2 fire control car
 M1918 repair car

Fate 
All four guns were cut up for scrap in 1946.

Gallery

See also 

 14"/50 caliber railway gun US World War I predecessor
 Angular mil
 Coast Artillery fire control system
 Coincidence rangefinder
 Gun laying
 Indirect fire
 List of U.S. Army weapons by supply catalog designation
 Railway gun
 Sound ranging

References

Bibliography 

 
 McGovern, Terrance and Smith, Bolling, American Coastal Defences 1885–1950 (Fortress series, Book 44), Osprey Publishing 2006, 
 Military Railroads on the Panama Canal Zone by Charles S. Small, Railroad monographs 1982
  (Vol. I at this link)
 J. C. Letts, Walker Redmon: Heavy Railway Artillery Transportation. in: The Military Engineer. Vol. 18, No. 100, 1926, p. 268–269
 TM 9-2300 Standard Artillery and Fire Control Material. dated 1944
 FM 4-35 Service of the Piece; 14-inch Gun, M1920MII on Railway Mount, M1920 (1940)
 SNL E-9
 SNL E-33
 Coast Artillery Journal December 1929
 American Coast Artillery Materiel 1922  (extensive manufacturing information)
 Coast Artillery Journal March April 1934

External links 

 "Gun Train Guards Ends of Panama Canal -- Rolling Fort Crosses Isthmus in Two Hours" Popular Mechanics, December 1934 pp.844-845 excellent drawings in article
 FortWiki gun type list

356 mm artillery
Artillery of the United States
Coastal artillery
Railway guns
World War II artillery of the United States
Military equipment introduced in the 1920s